Cerreto d'Asti is a comune (municipality) in the Province of Asti in the Italian region Piedmont, located about  east of Turin and about  northwest of Asti.

Cerreto d'Asti borders the following municipalities: Capriglio, Passerano Marmorito, and Piovà Massaia.

References

Cities and towns in Piedmont